Miroslav Rejman (17 October 1925 in Chrudim, Czechoslovakia – 31 January 2008 in Prague) was a Czech ice hockey player who competed in the 1952 Winter Olympics.

References

External links
 

1925 births
2008 deaths
Czech ice hockey forwards
Ice hockey players at the 1952 Winter Olympics
Olympic ice hockey players of Czechoslovakia
People from Chrudim
Sportspeople from the Pardubice Region
Czechoslovak ice hockey forwards